Red Sonja is a 1985 American epic sword and sorcery film directed by Richard Fleischer and written by Clive Exton and George MacDonald Fraser. It is based on the character created by Robert E. Howard, Red Sonya of Rogatino, who also inspired the comic book character of the same name. The film introduces Brigitte Nielsen as the title character, with Sandahl Bergman, Paul Smith, Ronald Lacey, and Arnold Schwarzenegger in supporting roles.

As in Howard's stories of Conan, the film takes place in the Hyborian Age, a fictional prehistoric time that had been depicted previously in the films Conan the Barbarian (1982) and Conan the Destroyer (1984).

Red Sonja was theatrically released in the United States on July 3, 1985, by MGM/UA Entertainment Co. Upon release, the film received generally negative reviews from critics. It grossed $6.9 million in the United States under a budget of $17.9 million, becoming a box-office bomb.

Plot

Sonja, a young, red-haired woman, is raped and left for dead by the soldiers of Queen Gedren, a despot who murdered Sonja's parents and brother after she rejected the queen's sexual advances and scarred Gedren's face. Answering Sonja's cry for revenge, a nameless female spirit appears and gives her heightened sword-fighting skills on the condition that she never lie with a man unless he defeats her in fair combat. She trains under the warriors of a sword-master called "The Grand Master" and distrusts nearly all other men. 

At a nearby temple, Varna, Sonja's sister, is in an order of priestesses preparing to banish a mystical light-powered relic, the Talisman, that created the world and all living things. The Talisman can be used and touched only by women – men vanish if they touch it – and has become too powerful to control. However, Gedren's army and her aide-de-camp Ikol intervene, slaughtering most of the priestesses and shield-maidens before they can imprison the Talisman in permanent darkness.

Varna watches Gedren steal the Talisman and throw the surviving priestesses in the vault that contained it, before escaping, but is mortally wounded. She is discovered by Kalidor, the Lord of Hyrkania, who goes to find Sonja and bring her to Varna. Before dying, Varna tells Sonja to find the Talisman and send it into darkness before it ravages the world with storms and earthquakes. Kalidor asks to accompany her, but she rejects the offer. 

After witnessing the Talisman in use, Sonja arrives to the now-ruined kingdom of Hablock. She meets the young, pig-headed Prince Tarn and his servant/bodyguard Falkon, who say Gedren used the Talisman to decimate Hablock when Tarn refused to surrender. Tarn announces that he will crush Gedren, and invites Sonja to be his cook. She politely declines before being told that Gedren is based in Berkubane, the land of Perpetual Night.

Arriving at the mountain gate, Sonja fights Lord Brytag after he refuses her passage for not paying him a "tender tribute". When she kills him and takes his key, his troops surround her; Kalidor, who has secretly followed her, attacks their rear, allowing Sonja to escape. Sonja comes across Tarn again, being tortured by bandits. She frees Tarn and kills the bandits with Falkon. They decide to travel together toward Berkubane, and Tarn takes Sonja's advice and learns good manners over sword practice. 

Gedren's wizard uses a large magic screen to show the approaching party; Gedren recognizes Sonja and orders that she be brought to the fortress unharmed. Using the Talisman to conjure a storm, she forces Sonja's group to take shelter in a watery cavern in Ictyan where Gedren's dragon-like “Killing Machine" is unleashed. Kalidor appears and helps Sonja blind the mechanical beast so they can escape.

Sonja accepts Kalidor's company after learning he is descended from the lords who entrusted the Talisman to the temple. He flirts with her, so she warns him that "no man can have her" unless he defeats her. Kalidor challenges her and they sword-fight to a draw, despite Tarn's trying to hobble Kalidor. The party arrives at Castle Berkubane and, to protect Tarn, they convince him to stay behind and guard the front entrance. 

Ikol, realizing Gedren is insane when she refuses his pleas to stop utilizing the unstable relic, plans to escape with bags of Hablock's gold. Sonja confronts Gedren in her council chamber and kills her wizard, while Kalidor and Falkon deal with her guards in the castle's dining hall. Ikol is stopped by Tarn at the entrance and is crushed to death by the door.

Overpowered by Sonja, Gedren flees to the Chamber of Lights where the Talisman is stored. Now powerful beyond control, the Talisman causes the floor to split open and reveal a chasm of molten lava. Dueling Gedren, Sonja runs her through with her sword, sending the evil ruler plunging into the lava below. Sonja throws the Talisman in after her, destroying it and starting a chain reaction that tears Castle Berkubane apart. 

The heroes manage to escape as the rising volcano consumes the castle. Sonja and Kalidor kiss after a brief, non-conclusive "sword fight", while Tarn and Falkon ride back to Hablock to rebuild it.

Cast

Production
A film adaptation of Red Sonja was first announced in 1983 with Ralph Bakshi directing. Production was pushed back a year and Bakshi was replaced with Richard Fleischer, who also directed the previous Robert E. Howard adaptation featuring Arnold Schwarzenegger Conan the Destroyer.

In Conan the Barbarian, Sandahl Bergman played Valeria, a thief and the love of Conan's life. Bergman was offered the role of Red Sonja, but turned it down, choosing instead to play the villainous Queen Gedren. De Laurentiis met with actress Laurene Landon and was set to offer her the role of Red Sonja until he discovered she was in an earlier film called Hundra; fearing that it was too similar, De Laurentiis decided not to give her the part. On a 2015 episode of Real Housewives of Beverly Hills, soap opera actress Eileen Davidson revealed that she auditioned for the role and was actually runner-up to Brigitte Nielsen. It took De Laurentiis almost a year to find an actress "Amazonian" enough to play the title character; he was still looking, eight weeks before the scheduled production, when he saw Brigitte Nielsen on the cover of a fashion magazine. The 21-year-old native of Helsingør, Denmark, in Milan for a modeling job, soon found herself on a plane heading for Rome and a successful screen test.

George MacDonald Fraser, who had recently adapted Twenty Thousand Leagues Under the Sea for De Laurentiis, was hired to work on the script during filming.

Several scenes were shot in Italy, around the Gran Sasso massif (Celano, Campo Felice and Campo Imperatore), and in  studios in Rome.

Music

The musical score of Red Sonja was composed and conducted by Ennio Morricone.

Soundtrack

Track listing for the first release on LP

 Symphonic Suite for Chorus and Orchestra - Part I (16:37)
 Symphonic Suite for Chorus and Orchestra - Part II (18:42)

Track listing for the CD release

 Prologue (01:24)
 Main Title (02:22)
 The Talisman (03:15)
 Temple Raid (01:39)
 Touch It (01:03)
 Sonja and the Sword Master (01:49)
 Vanna's Death (02:00)
 The Gate of Brytag (01:47)
 Sonja vs. Brytag (01:14)
 Fighting the Soldiers (03:36)
 The Chamber of Lights (02:02)
 Sorcery (00:46)
 Sonja Teaches Tarn (01:33)
 Treasure in the Cavern (02:07)
 Kalidor and Sonja (01:43)
 A Fair Fight (01:50)
 Entering the Castle (02:12)
 Sonja Defeats the Queen (01:36)
 End Credits (03:42)

Reception

Critical response
The film received generally negative reviews from critics. Rotten Tomatoes gave the film a score of 21% based on 28 reviews, with the site's critical consensus stating, "Dull, poorly directed, and badly miscast, Red Sonja is an uninspired conclusion to Schwarzenegger's barbarian trilogy." On Metacritic the film has a score of 35% based on reviews from 6 critics, indicating "generally unfavorable reviews".

Schwarzenegger commented, "It's the worst film I have ever made." He joked, "Now I tell my kids that, if they get out of line, they'll be forced to watch Red Sonja ten times in a row. It must be working, because I've never had much trouble with any of them."

John Grant, who authored the film's entry in The Encyclopedia of Fantasy (1997), gave Red Sonja a negative review, commenting "Morally dubious (Gedren's lesbianism is depicted as one of her evil attributes) and worse-acted than words can explain, Red Sonja is a great embarrassment."

Film historian Leonard Maltin gave the movie 1.5 out of a possible 4 stars. He went on to cite the picture as: "Spectacularly silly...While it might amuse juvenile viewers, most of the fun for adults is in deciding who gives the worse performance -- Brigitte Nielsen or Sandahl Bergman. Ennio Morricone's music score is far better than a film like this one deserves, as are Danilo Donati's costumes and sets."

Joe Kane, the "Phantom of the Movies", gave the film an even worse review: 1 out of 4 stars. According to him, "While Conan the Barbarian was sword-and-sorcery, this is grunt-and-groan: the actors grunt, while the audience groans...Amid wooden thespianism, redundant comedy relief, and clunky storytelling, Arnold Schwarzenegger's most impressive feat is managing to stay offscreen for more than half the running time despite being top-billed."

Siskel and Ebert also gave the film negative reviews. Both Gene Siskel and Roger Ebert agreed that the film was poorly made, yet it contained enough campy humor that it might have been intended as a spoof; Ebert noted the "dialogue which sounds like the actors have already read the Mad magazine parody of this film". Both critics laughed during their reviews, notably when Siskel noted the awkward position of the Buddha statue.

Andrea Wright, writing for the Journal of Gender Studies, has argued that the film represents a problematical representation of women, because the character of Red Sonja is sexualized and relies on a male counterpart.

Accolades
The film was nominated for three Golden Raspberry Awards, Worst Actress, Worst New Star (Nielsen) and Worst Supporting Actress (Sandahl Bergman). Nielsen won in the Worst New Star category, shared for her performance in Rocky IV.

Other media

Comic books
Marvel Comics published a comic book adaptation of the film by writer Louise Simonson and artists Mary Wilshire and Vince Colletta in Marvel Super Special #38. The adaptation was also available as a two-issue limited series.

Reboot

A second Red Sonja film had been in development for several years. In 2008, Robert Rodriguez and his production company Troublemaker Studios were working on a version that would have starred Rose McGowan as the titular character. By 2009 however, the Rodriguez project had been scrapped, and as of February 2010, rights holders Nu Image were moving forward with another projected new film, to be directed by Simon West. Producer Avi Lerner said he would like to see Amber Heard take the role of Sonja, after having worked with her on Drive Angry. Lerner said the film would shoot before the sequel to Conan the Barbarian. In August 2012 at the premiere of The Expendables 2 West said that the film was stuck in production. In February 2015 it was reported that Christopher Cosmos had been hired as a screenwriter for the new film.

In November 2017, Deadline reported that Millennium Films would finance and produce a new Red Sonja film with Lerner and Joe Gatta producing alongside Cinelou Films’ Mark Canton and Courtney Solomon and written by Ashley Miller. In September 2018, The Hollywood Reporter reported that the studio was eyeing Bryan Singer to direct the film. In October 2018, Singer was confirmed to direct the film. On February 11, 2019, Millennium Films announced Red Sonja was no longer on their slate of films, due to recent sexual abuse allegations against Singer. In March 2019, according to a Charlotte Kirk article, Lerner dropped Singer from the project because he was unable to secure a domestic distributor. In June 2019, Joey Soloway signed on to write, direct and produce the film. On February 26, 2021, The Hollywood Reporter announced that Tasha Huo will write the film. On May 5, 2021, the same publication announced that Hannah John-Kamen is cast as the title character. The movie is supposed to film in 2022. It's reported that Hannah and Joey both left the film. Millennium films has picked M.J. Bassett to write and direct the film and have opened a casting call due to this. The titular character will be played by Matilda Lutz.

See also
 List of American films of 1985
 Arnold Schwarzenegger filmography

References

External links

 
 
 

Red Sonja
1985 films
1980s fantasy adventure films
American fantasy adventure films
Films directed by Richard Fleischer
Film spin-offs
American high fantasy films
Films based on works by Robert E. Howard
Films set in castles
Films shot in Italy
Films shot in Rome
American rape and revenge films
Films with screenplays by George MacDonald Fraser
American sword and sorcery films
Films scored by Ennio Morricone
Metro-Goldwyn-Mayer films
United Artists films
Films with screenplays by Clive Exton
Golden Raspberry Award winning films
1980s English-language films
1980s American films